Spencer H. "Stiles" Bronson (September 15, 1842 – September 20, 1930) was an American politician. He served in the South Dakota State Senate from 1889 to 1890.

References

South Dakota state senators
1842 births
1930 deaths
People from Howard, South Dakota